Vittorio Gallese is professor of Psychobiology at the University of Parma, Italy, and was professor in Experimental Aesthetics at the University of London, UK (2016-2018). He is an expert in neurophysiology, cognitive neuroscience, social neuroscience, and philosophy of mind. Gallese is one of the discoverers of mirror neurons. His research attempts to elucidate the functional organization of brain mechanisms underlying social cognition, including action understanding, empathy, language, mindreading and aesthetic experience.

Background
Vittorio Gallese, MD, studied medicine at the University of Parma, Parma, Italy, and was awarded a degree in Neurology in 1990. He is a Full Professor of physiology in the Department of Neuroscience of the University of Parma, Full Professor in Experimental Aesthetics at the Institute of Philosophy, School of Advanced Study of the University of London, UK and Adjunct Senior Research Scholar at the Dept. of Art History and Archeology, Columbia University, New York, USA. He is coordinator of the PhD Program in Neuroscience and Director of the Doctoral School of Medicine of the University of Parma. As a cognitive neuroscientist, his research focuses on the relationship between the sensory-motor system and cognition, both in non-human primates and humans using a variety of neurophysiological and functional neuroimaging techniques applied to the study of intersubjectivity, empathy, language, mindreading and aesthetics. He also applies neuroscientific methods to study Autism and Schizophrenia. Among his major contributions is the discovery, together with the colleagues of Parma, of mirror neurons, and the elaboration of a theoretical model of basic aspects of social cognition, Embodied Simulation Theory. For many years he has been involved in collaborations with scholars of other disciplines, like philosophy of mind (collaborating with Alvin Goldman, Thomas Metzinger and Corrado Sinigaglia), cognitive linguistics (collaborating with George Lakoff and Art Glenberg), aesthetics (collaborating with David Freedberg and Hava Aldouby), psychiatry  and psychoanalysis (collaborating with Morris Eagle, Paolo Migone, Thomas Fuchs, and Josef Parnas) and narratology (collaborating with Hannah Wojchiehowski).

Gallese has been doing research at the University of Lausanne, Switzerland, at the Nihon University, Tokyo, Japan, at the University of California at Berkeley and at the Berlin School of Mind and Brain of the Humboldt University of Berlin. He has been George Miller visiting professor at the University of California at Berkeley. In 2007 he received together with Giacomo Rizzolatti and Leonardo Fogassi the Grawemeyer Award for Psychology, for the discovery of mirror neurons. He received the Doctor Honoris Causa from the Catholic University of Leuven, Belgium in 2009. He received the Arnold Pfeffer Prize for Neuropsychoanalysis from the International Society of Neuropsychoanalysis, New York, U.S.A in 2010, the Musatti Prize from the Italian Psychoanalytic Society in 2013, the Kosmos Fellowship from the Berlin School of Mind and Brain in 2014, the Einstein Fellowship for 2016-2020, and the Alexander von Humboldt Forschung Preis in 2019.

Gallese has published over 300 papers in international peer-reviewed journals and edited books and three books.

Embodied simulation theory and mirror neurons
Gallese is probably best well known for two interconnecting areas of research – mirror neurons and embodied simulation theory. Embodied simulation theory is, amongst other things, a theory of social cognition – a theory of how it is we understand others' actions, basic intentions, emotions and sensations. Gallese states "that the fundamental mechanism that allows us a direct experiential grasp of the mind of others is not conceptual reasoning but direct simulation of the observed events through the mirror mechanism."  Gallese states that the mirror mechanism in humans is the neurophysiological substrate that underpins the embodied simulatory process. Gallese posits the simulation process plays a constitutive role in basic forms of mind reading. Gallese has defended simulation theory and the role mirror neurons play in simulation over the course of several decades and has recently done so in response to criticisms from de Bruin and Gallagher, who argue that one of simulation theories central theoretical notions, reuse in bodily format – underpinned by the MNS, lacks explanatory power. Gallese argued in response that "the notion of reuse of mental states represented
with a bodily format provides a convincing simulational account of the mirroring mechanism (MM) and its role in mind-reading."

Embodied simulation theory: space and objects
Observing the world is more complex than the mere activation of the visual brain. Vision is multimodal: it encompasses the activation of motor, somatosensory and emotion-related brain networks. Any intentional relation entertained with the external world  has an intrinsic pragmatic nature, hence it always bears a motor content. The same motor circuits that control our motor behavior also map the space around us, the objects at hand in that very same space, thus defining and shaping in motor terms their representational content. The space around us is defined by the motor potentialities of our body. Motor neurons also respond to visual, tactile and auditory stimuli. Indeed, premotor neurons controlling the movements of the upper arm also respond to tactile stimuli applied to it, to visual stimuli moved within the arm's peripersonal space, or to auditory stimuli also coming from the same peri-personal space. The same applies to artifacts, like three-dimensional objects. The manipulable objects we look at are classified by the motor brain as potential targets of the interactions we might entertain with them. Premotor and parietal 'canonical neurons' control the grasping and manipulation of objects and also respond to their mere observation. The functional architecture of embodied simulation seems to constitute a basic characteristic of our brain, making possible our rich and diversified experiences of space, objects and other individuals, being at the basis of our capacity to empathize with them."

See also
 Mirror neurons
 Empathy
 Motor cognition
 Common coding theory
 Affective neuroscience
 Psychoanalysis
 Philosophy of mind
 Theory of mind
 Neuroscience
 Social neuroscience
 Language
 Aesthetics
 Neuroaesthetics

References

Editorial duties
 Associate Editor of Psychopathology
 Member of the Editorial Board of Social Cognitive and Affective Neuroscience
 Member of the Editorial Board of Cognitive Neuroscience
 Member of the Editorial Board of Biological Theory
 Member of the Editorial Board of Phenomenology and the Cognitive Sciences
 Member of the Editorial Board of Neuropsychoanalysis
 Member of the Scientific Committee of the Fondation Fyssen Paris (France).

Selected books
 Stamenov, N.I., and Gallese, V. (2002). Mirror Neurons and the Evolution of Brain and Language. Amsterdam: John Benjamins Publishing Co.
 Ammaniti, M. & Gallese, V. (2014) The Birth of Intersubjectivity. Psychodynamics, Neurobiology and the Self. W. W. Norton & Company, pp. 236.
 Gallese, V. e Guerra, M. (2015) Lo Schermo Empatico. Cinema e Neuroscienze. Milano: Raffaello Cortina Editore, pp. 350.
 Gallese, V. e Guerra, M. (2020) The Empathic Screen. Cinema and Neuroscience. Oxford: Oxford University Press, pp. 272.

Selected references
 
 
 
 
 
 
 
 
 
 
 
 
 
 
 
 
 
 
 
 
 
 
 
 
.
 
 
 Gallese V. (2014) Mirror neurons and the perception-action link. In: Oxford Handbook of Cognitive Neuroscience. S. Kosslyn & K. Ochsner (Eds). Oxford: Oxford University Press. Vol. 2, pp. 244–256.
 
 Gallese V., Cuccio V. (2015) Embodied Simulation: A Paradigm for the Constitution of Self and Others. A Reply to Christian Pfeiffer. In: Metzinger. T. & Windt, J.M. (eds): Open MIND. Frankfurt: MIND Group, pp. 1–5.
 Gallese V., Gattara A. (2015) Embodied simulation, Aesthetics and Architecture: An experimental aesthetic approach. In: Mind in Architecture: Neuroscience, Embodiment and the Future of Design, Sarah Robinson and Juhani Pallasmaa, eds., Boston, MA, MIT Press, pp. 161–179.

External links
 Vittorio Gallese Lab 
 University of Parma 
 Researchgate 
 Academia.edu 
 Acting and Mirror Neurons 
 The Eye of the Beholder 
 Festival della Mente Sarzana, Italia: "Il corpo nella mente. Neuroscienze ed esperienza estetica" 
 Interview on Mirror Neurons (in Italian) 
 Radio WNYC, The Leonard Lopate Show: "Mirror neurons and personality" 
 The body in Aesthetic Experience. University of California at ∫erkeley 
 Sandler Conference, Frankfurt 
 Interview, Fondation Agalma 
 Debate at NYU with Greg Hickok on mirror neurons 

Living people
University of Parma alumni
Academic staff of the University of Parma
Academics of the University of London
Italian neuroscientists
1959 births